Brad Fritsch (born November 9, 1977) is a Canadian professional golfer.

Career
Fritsch was born in Edmonton, Alberta and grew up in Ottawa, Ontario.

Fritsch played on the Canadian Tour from 2001 to 2006 and again from 2010 to 2011. His best finish was second at the 2004 Bay Mills Open Players Championship. He played on the Web.com Tour from 2007 to 2009, 2012 and 2015. He won the Web.com Tour Qualifying Tournament in 2014. His best finish was T-2 at the 2012 Mylan Classic.

Fritsch gained his PGA Tour card for 2013 by finishing in the top 25 of the Web.com Tour money list in 2012. He improved his position by finishing T-7 at the 2012 PGA Tour Qualifying School. He made 18 cuts in 24 events in 2013, finishing 142nd on the money list and missing the FedEx Cup playoffs by four places (ranked 129th). He played in the Web.com Tour Finals and finished 14th to regain his PGA Tour card for 2014. He won his first Web.com Tour tournament, the Servientrega Championship, in 2016.

In 2013, Fritsch represented Canada in the World Cup together with David Hearn and the two-man team finished 5th.

Fritsch was suspended by the PGA Tour for three months in 2018 for violation of its anti-doping policy after he self-reported taking a banned substance. Taking to Facebook, Fritsch said he was 'embarrassed' at not paying attention to the supplements that was in the spray which he was taking as part of a weight loss program.

Professional wins (2)

Web.com Tour wins (1)

Web.com Tour playoff record (1–0)

Other wins (1)
2006 Azores Open

Team appearances
Professional
World Cup (representing Canada): 2013

See also
2012 Web.com Tour graduates
2012 PGA Tour Qualifying School graduates
2013 Web.com Tour Finals graduates
2016 Web.com Tour Finals graduates

References

External links

Canadian male golfers
PGA Tour golfers
Korn Ferry Tour graduates
Campbell Fighting Camels golfers
Golfing people from Alberta
Golfing people from Ontario
Golfers from North Carolina
Sportspeople from Edmonton
Sportspeople from Ottawa
People from Holly Springs, North Carolina
1977 births
Living people